Vepris allenii is a species of plant in the family Rutaceae. It is endemic to Mozambique.

References

allenii
Endemic flora of Mozambique
Data deficient plants
Taxonomy articles created by Polbot